The 2014–15 season was Edinburgh Rugby's fourteenth season competing in the Pro12.

Team

Coaches
Alan Solomons will continue as head coach along with Stevie Scott as assistant coach.

Squad

(c) Denotes team captain, 
Italicised denotes Scottish qualifiedTC denotes players signed on a trial contract.

BT Sport Scottish Rugby Academy Stage 3 players
 Chris Auld - Centre
 Magnus Bradbury - Back row
 Hugh Fraser - Scrum half
 Alex Glashan - Scrum half
 Ruaridh Howarth - Full back
 Jake Kerr - Hooker
 Max McFarland - Wing/Full-back
 Ewan McQuillin - Prop
 Ally Miller - Back row
 Ben Robbins - Wing
 Rory Sutherland - Prop
 Callum Sheldon - Prop

Transfers

Personnel In
  Neil Cochrane from  Wasps
  Damien Hoyland from  Melrose RFC
 / Allan Dell from   
 / Nick McLennan from  Hawke's Bay
  Michael Tait from  Newcastle Falcons
  Chris Dean from  Scotland 7s
  John Andress from Worcester Warriors
  Jamie Ritchie from Howe of Fife RFC
  Tom Heathcote from Bath
  Fraser McKenzie from Newcastle Falcons
  Phil Burleigh from  Highlanders
  Anton Bresler from the Sharks
  Brett Thompson from  USA 7s
  Grant Shiells from Bath
  Hugh Blake from Otago trial contracts
  Jade Te Rure from Manawatutrial contracts
  Nathan Fowles from Sale Sharks loan

Personnel Out

  Steven Lawrie retired 
  Ben Cairns retired 
  Greig Laidlaw to  Gloucester
  Izak van der Westhuizen to  
  Geoff Cross to  London Irish
  Sean Cox to  London Irish
  Piers Francis released
  Gregor Hunter released
  Harry Leonard to  Yorkshire Carnegie
  Nick De Luca to  Biarritz Olympique
  Robin Hislop to  Rotherham Titans
  Ross Rennie to  Bristol
  Dimitri Basilaia
  Lee Jones
  Perry Parker to  Rotherham Titans
  Chris Leck
  Lewis Niven to Edinburgh Accies
  Alex Black
  Alun Walker
  Robert McAlpine
  Aleki Lutui to  Gloucester
  Michael Tait retired
  Omar Mouneimne
  Nikki Walker to Hawick RFC
  Wicus Blaauw released
 Brett Thompson released

Sponsorship
 BT Sport
 Mitsubishi Cars

Competitions

Player statistics
During the 2014–15 season, Edinburgh have used forty five different players in competitive games. The table below shows the number of appearances and points scored by each player.

Pre season

Match 1

Match 2

Pro12

League table

Results

Round 1

Round 2

Round 3

Round 4

Round 5

Round 6

Round 7

Round 8

Round 9

Round 10

Round 11 (1872 Cup - 16-6 agg.)

Round 12 (1872 Cup - 26-24 agg.)

Round 13

Round 14

Round 15

Round 16

Round 17

Round 18

Round 19

Round 20

Round 21

Round 22

Europe

Table

Results

Round 1

Round 2

Round 3

Round 4

Round 5

Round 6

Knock-out stage

Quarter finals

Semi finals

Finals

References

2014–15 in Scottish rugby union
2014-15
2014–15 Pro12 by team
2014–15 European Rugby Champions Cup by team